Arthur William James Anthony Greenwood, Baron Greenwood of Rossendale,  (14 September 1911 – 12 April 1982) was a prominent British Labour Party politician in the 1950s and 1960s.

Background and education
The son of Arthur Greenwood (Deputy Leader of the Labour Party under Clement Attlee) and his wife Catherine Ainsworth, Greenwood was born in Leeds and educated at Merchant Taylors' School, and then read politics, philosophy and economics at Balliol College, Oxford, where he held the posts of chairman of the Labour Club and, in 1933, president of the Oxford Union. In 1933 he visited India as a member of the British Universities' Debating Team.

Early life
After university Greenwood continued with political work, which included debating trips to the USA and some freelance journalism. He began, but did not complete, studies for the Bar at the Middle Temple. Early employment consisted of a spell as economic secretary to an industrialist and then, in 1938–39, work for the National Fitness Council. From 1939 to 1942 Greenwood worked at the Ministry of Information where, in 1941, he became private secretary to the Director-General Walter Monckton, with whom he travelled to Russia and the Middle East. In the summer of 1942 he joined the Royal Air Force, and in February 1943 was commissioned as an Intelligence Officer. In December 1944 he was seconded to the War Cabinet Offices, to work with Monckton on an inquiry into the Mulberry harbours.

Political career
Greenwood joined the Labour Party at the age of 14 and was a prospective candidate for Colchester before the war. He led the Labour group on Hampstead Borough Council from 1945 until 1949, and entered Parliament as member for Heywood and Radcliffe in a by-election in February 1946. Following boundary changes, he moved to represent Rossendale in 1950. He was vice-chairman of the Parliamentary Labour Party in 1950–51, and was in the Shadow Cabinet from 1951 to 1952 and from 1955 to 1960. He also served on the party's National Executive Committee from 1954 to 1960 and became the first Chair of Labour Friends of Israel in 1957.

Greenwood was the left wing challenger to Hugh Gaitskell in the 1961 leadership election when he received the support of just over a quarter of the Labour MPs. He served successively from 1964 to 1969 as Secretary of State for the Colonies, Minister of Overseas Development and Minister for Housing and Local Government in Harold Wilson's governments. As Colonial Secretary, he took forward the detachment of the Chagos Islands from the territory of Mauritius and the creation by Order in Council of a British Indian Ocean Territory (BIOT) to facilitate the establishment of an American military base on the island of Diego Garcia.

On 22 September 1970, Greenwood was created a life peer as Baron Greenwood of Rossendale, of East Mersea, in the County of Essex. From 1977 to 1979 he was Chairman of the House of Lords Select Committee on the European Communities and Principal Deputy Chairman of Committees.

Business career
While in the Lords, Greenwood held a number of business directorships. He remained a member of the Commonwealth Development Corporation board until 1978, was a Director of the Britannia Building Society from 1972 until his death and Chairman from 1974 to 1976, Chairman and a Director of Weeks Natural Resources (UK) Ltd., an oil exploration company, and Chairman of Greenwood Development Holdings Ltd. He was Chairman of Integrated Professional Development Service and a Director of Pochin Ltd.

Other public appointments
He also held several public service appointments, such as Chairman of the Local Government Training Board and Staff Commission, President of the Association of Metropolitan Authorities, President of the District Heating Association, President of the Cremation Society of Great Britain, a member of the Maplin Development Authority board and Central Lancashire Development Corporation and became involved in several housing organisations. He was Pro-Chancellor of the University of Lancaster from 1972 to 1978 and financial adviser for the University of Guyana's UK appeal. He became Chairman of the Anglo-Israel Association in 1972, was a Trustee of the Jerusalem Educational Trust and Chairman of the Labour Friends of Israel. He gave support to many charitable organisations and was a founding member of the Campaign for Nuclear Disarmament.

Later life and death 
 
Greenwood died in 1982 at the age of 70. He was cremated at Golders Green Crematorium.

See also
Politics of the United Kingdom

References

External links 
 
 Political Papers of Arthur Greenwood (1880–1954) and Anthony Greenwood - Bodleian Library, University of Oxford website dated 5 October 1998.

1911 births
1982 deaths
Labour Party (UK) MPs for English constituencies
Labour Friends of Israel
British Secretaries of State
Secretaries of State for the Colonies
Alumni of Balliol College, Oxford
Members of the Privy Council of the United Kingdom
Members of the Middle Temple
People associated with Lancaster University
Presidents of the Oxford Union
Councillors in Greater London
Royal Air Force personnel of World War II
UK MPs 1945–1950
UK MPs 1950–1951
UK MPs 1951–1955
UK MPs 1955–1959
UK MPs 1959–1964
UK MPs 1964–1966
UK MPs 1966–1970
UK MPs who were granted peerages
Greenwood of Rossendale
Members of Hampstead Metropolitan Borough Council
Chairs of the Labour Party (UK)
20th-century British lawyers
Ministers in the Wilson governments, 1964–1970
Life peers created by Elizabeth II